The Last Page, released in the United States as Man Bait, is a 1952 British film noir produced by Hammer Film Productions starring George Brent, Marguerite Chapman and Diana Dors.

The film is notable for being the first Hammer film directed by Terence Fisher, who later played a critical role in the creation of the company's immensely successful horror film cycle.

The Last Page is also notable for being the first film made under a four-year production and distribution contract between Hammer and the US film distribution company Lippert Pictures. As in all of these films, the leading role was played by a well-known Hollywood actor supplied by Lippert to ensure familiarity with American audiences.

Plot 
Ruby Bruce (Dors), an attractive young bookstore clerk, catches small-time crook Jeff Hart (Reynolds) trying to steal a rare book. Instead of turning him in, she accepts a date with him. Later, the bookstore manager John Harman (Brent) reprimands Ruby for being late to work. When Harman later tries to kiss Ruby, she tells Hart, who persuades Ruby to blackmail Harman. When he refuses to pay, Jeff tells Ruby to write a letter to Harman's sick wife, which causes her death from a heart attack. Dazed by the tragedy, Harman gives Ruby £300 when she renews her demands. Jeff catches Ruby hiding part of the money, kills her and hides her body in a packing case. Harman discovers Ruby's body and, thinking he will be accused, flees in panic. He enlists the help of his secretary Stella (Chapman) who helps him hunt for clues to the killer. When Stella stumbles on Hart alone, she is nearly killed by him, but Harman arrives in time to save her. The police arrest Hart.

Cast 
 George Brent as John Harman
 Marguerite Chapman as Stella Tracy
 Diana Dors as Ruby Bruce
 Meredith Edwards as Inspector Dale
 Harry Fowler as Joe, clerk
 Raymond Huntley as Clive Oliver
 Peter Reynolds as Jeffrey (Jeff) Hart
 Eleanor Summerfield as Vi
 Nelly Arno as Miss Rossetti

Production
The film was based on a play by James Hadley Chase which premiered in London in 1946. In March 1949 it was announced producer John Corfield had the rights.

Under British law at the time, there was a quota for British films - many American movies had a British film play as a double feature. Robert Lippert distributed his films in Britain via Exclusive, the parent company of Hammer Films. He signed a deal with Hammer to make movies for the British market; they would be shot in Britain using British talent but an American star. The Last Page was the first movie. The star was George Brent who had just made FBI Girl for Lippert.

The film was also known as Murder in Safety and Blonde Blackmail. Chase's play was adapted into a script by Frederick Knott, who had just written Dial M for Murder.

The opening credits read "Introducing Diana Dors," although she had made her debut in The Shop at Sly Corner (1946) and been in a number of other films.

Brent left for England on July 2, 1951.
Filming started July 9, 1951.

It was the first of seven crime movies Terence Fisher would direct for Hammer.

Reception
Filmink said "the best thing about it is Dors’ performance: lonely, put-about, hungry for love, insecure. The movie is never as good once her character disappears, but is still definitely worth seeking out if you like your low-budget British noirs."

References

External links 
 
 
Man Bait at TCMDB
The Last Page (as "Man Bait") at BFI
The Last Page at Letterbox DVD
Review of film at Variety
Review of film at Cinema Retro

1952 films
1952 crime drama films
British crime drama films
British black-and-white films
Film noir
Films based on works by James Hadley Chase
British films based on plays
Films directed by Terence Fisher
Hammer Film Productions films
Lippert Pictures films
Films set in London
1950s English-language films
1950s British films